The Per Il Volo Miniplane is an Italian paramotor designed and produced by Per Il Volo of Galliera Veneta for powered paragliding. It was introduced in 1989 and remains in production.

Design and development
The aircraft was designed as a light weight paramotor, giving due consideration to the fact that the pilot has to wear the engine on his or her back and run with it for take-off. It features a paraglider-style high-wing, single-place accommodation and a single Per Il Volo Top 80  engine in pusher configuration. As is the case with all paramotors, take-off and landing is accomplished by foot.

To keep the design as light as possible a simple harness is used. The single cylinder, two-stroke, fan-cooled aircraft engine incorporates some unique features that make it especially suitable for its role. Its reduction gearbox results in the engine and propeller turning in different directions, thereby reducing the resulting torque absorbed by the pilot . The engine also incorporates a centrifugal clutch that allows the engine to idle without the propeller turning, which improves safety during canopy inflation and launch, as well as landing.

The aircraft can be completely disassembled for ground transportation or storage. The aluminum and fibreglass frame folds and the fuel tank is removable.

Variants
Miniplane 115
Miniplane 125

Specifications (Miniplane 125)

See also

References

External links

1980s Italian ultralight aircraft
Single-engined pusher aircraft
Paramotors